Tintin in India or The Mystery of the Blue Diamond, is a 1941 Belgian theatre piece in three acts written by Hergé and Jacques Van Melkebeke. It features Hergé's famous character, Tintin,  and covers much of the second half of Cigars of the Pharaoh as Tintin attempts to rescue a stolen blue diamond. The events of the story occur within the chronology of Tintin stories, between The Crab with the Golden Claws and The Shooting Star.

History 
Van Melkebeke wrote the first and third act, with Hergé writing the second act. This was the first time that Hergé worked so closely with another author to write one of his works. The play was performed at the Théâtre Royal des Galeries in Brussels, directed by Paul Riga, and found success with the public. The script of the play is considered to be lost.

It is possible that the inspiration for the diamond comes from the story about Hope Diamond ("le bleu de france").

List of characters and cast 
In order of appearance:
 Prime Minister Badapour: Reginald Dourka Romane
 Durant and Durand: Marcel André — the two detectives commonly known (in English) as Thomson and Thompson. Here they are introduced by name for the first time — as "Durant and Durand", although they were later renamed "Dupont and Dupond". 
 Dr. Mickey Nickolson: Georges Keppens
 Ms. Nickolson: Nelly Corbusier
 The Maharajah of Padakhore: Franz Joubert
 Mr. Chippendale (archaeologist): Paul Riga
 Madame Chippendale: Christiane Wéry
 Viscount Koulanky, Ambassador of Ruritania: Paul Saussus
 Tintin : Jeanne Rubens
 Fakir Caudebathimouva Thoubva: Dara Gee
 Maharaja's servant: Jean Dusart
 Rampura Lieutenant: Dara Gee

Synopsis

Act one 
Pedakhore Palace, India. The Maharaja and the invited persons enter: The Ambassador to Syldavie Count Koulansky, Doctor Nicholson and his wife, and the nearly deaf archaeologist Chippendale accompanied by his wife. A telegram announces the arrival of Tintin. Count Koulansky is delighted. Since the affairs surrounding The Sceptre of Ottokar, Tintin is popularly considered a hero in Syldavia. A young reporter arrives and the soirée commences. Caudebathimouva Thoubva is to demonstrate hypnotism, followed by a large Indian ballet. At the end of the soirée, the Maharaja has prepared a presentation for those invited on the celebrated blue diamond. However, it is revealed that the diamond has disappeared. Tintin concludes that the thief is amongst the invited. Durant and Durand investigate, but without success. Tintin suggests that those to be questioned continue with him on the voyage to Syldavia aboard the Rampura.

Act two 
Aboard the Rampura, Tintin questions those who were at the events of the night before, but one of the servants of the Maharaja has departed. Tintin decides to send a telegram before the boat arrives in Syldavia.

Act three 
In the medieval hall of the Chateau of Syldavia, Tintin, with the use of his telegram, catches the thief.

References

Notes

Sources consulted 
 Tintinologist.com
Assouline, Pierre; Ruas, Charles (2009). Hergé: The Man Who Created Tintin. Oxford University Press, USA. p. 218. .
 Lofficier, Jean-Marc; Lofficier, Randy (2002). The Pocket Essential Tintin. Harpenden, Hertfordshire: Pocket Essentials. .
 Peeters, Benoît (2012). Hergé: Son of Tintin. Tina A. Kover (translator). Baltimore, Maryland: Johns Hopkins University Press. . (First published 2002.)
 Sadoul, Numa (1975). Tintin et moi: entretiens avec Hergé [Tintin and I: Interviews with Hergé] (in French). Casterman. .
 Thompson, Harry (1991). Tintin: Hergé and His Creation. London: John Murray Publishers Ltd. .

Belgian plays
Works by Hergé
1941 plays
Comedy plays
Tintin
Plays based on comic strips
Plays set in Belgium
Plays set in India